Chrámec is a village and municipality in the Rimavská Sobota District of the Banská Bystrica Region of southern Slovakia.

History
Old settlement, in historical records, the village was first mentioned in 1246  (1246 Hajamuch, 1294 Harmach, 1348 Harmath), as belonging to feudatories Birin and Michael. After it passed to nobles Hunt-Poznany. From the 15th to the 16th century it belonged to local Paulin Friars. From 1938 to 1945 it was annexed by Hungary.

Genealogical resources

The records for genealogical research are available at the state archive "Statny Archiv in Banska Bystrica, Slovakia"

 Roman Catholic church records (births/marriages/deaths): 1745-1883 (parish B)
 Reformated church records (births/marriages/deaths): 1748-1897 (parish A)

See also
 List of municipalities and towns in Slovakia

External links
https://web.archive.org/web/20071027094149/http://www.statistics.sk/mosmis/eng/run.html
Surnames of living people in Chramec

Villages and municipalities in Rimavská Sobota District
Hungarian communities in Slovakia